Grupo RBS is a Brazilian media conglomerate founded on August 31, 1957 by Maurício Sirotsky Sobrinho. One of Brazil’s  largest communication groups, it is also the largest one affiliated with Rede Globo. The media group is made up by radio and television stations as well as newspapers and online news portals, which deliver journalistic and entertainment content. Along with its more than 6,000 employees, Grupo RBS constitutes the second largest company in Brazil when it comes to the number of journalists employed.

Grupo RBS owns 12 broadcasting TV stations affiliated to Rede Globo (RBS TV), 2 local broadcasting TV stations (TVCOM Florianópolis and OCTO OC Porto Alegre), 24 radio stations (Rádio Gaúcha, Rádio Atlântida, Rádio Itapema, Rádio Cidade, Rádio Farroupilha, Rádio CBN Porto Alegre, Rádio CBN Diário, Rádio Rural), and 8 newspapers (Zero Hora, Diário Gaúcho, Pioneiro, Diário de Santa Maria, Diário Catarinense, Hora de Santa Catarina, Jornal de Santa Catarina, A Notícia).

Grupo RBS also operates a digital company, e.Bricks Digital, made up of technology enterprises through which the media group makes itself present in areas such as technology and digital media, mobile and segment-specific e-commerce.

Grupo RBS has yet other branches of operation: HSM (executive education, media and events company) – Digital Product Development unit – Kzuka (aimed at young audiences) – Events – RBS Publicações (book publishing) – Orbeat Music (record company) – Mídia Gráfica (printing) – Vialog (logistics company) – Fundação Maurício Sirotsky Sobrinho (social trust).

Grupo RBS’ institutional campaigns

Institutional campaigns are one of Grupo RBS’ most traditional actions and one of its most important social investment traditions. Nonprofit and noncommercial whatsoever, these are great social mobilization campaigns which involve all of the company's multimedia platforms, as well as it co-workers, and include branches such as editorial (News broadcast/published by the group's media outlets) advertising (advertisements carried on all media) and institutional (mobilization actions alongside government and community agents).

In recent years, RBS has raised its voice on a variety of issues such as road safety, child protection and crack abuse prevention. These campaigns have achieved countless results, among which stand out the establishment of a Child and Youth Debate Day, already in its 10th year; a partnership set out with the National Justice Council for the country-wide airing of the Crack, Nem Pensar (Don't Even Think About Crack) campaign in 2011 (the crack abuse prevention campaign); and the establishment of the Instituto Crack, Nem Pensar (The Don't Even Think About Crack Institute), based in Porto Alegre.

Love is the Best Inheritance, Take Care of the Kids

The institutional campaign "O Amor é a Melhor Herança, Cuide das Crianças" (Love is the Best Inheritance, Take Care of the Kids) was launched in June 2003, and had intended to highlight the importance of care that the society must have with kids and teens. This campaign also featured the presence of five friendly monsters and her cubs: the Devil, the Bogeyman, the Witch, the Headless Mule and the Black Face Ox. At the end of 2003, join the sixth monster, the Bad Wolf with their puppies.

Education Needs Answers

The institutional campaign “A Educação Precisa de Respostas” (Education Needs Answers) was launched in 2012 as a wide-range society mobilization campaign. Led by Grupo RBS, it aims at bringing forward discussion groups and the search for solutions to elevate the level of primary education across Brazil and specially within Rio Grande do Sul and Santa Catarina states.
The campaign was carried on as a partnership with Fundação Maurício Sirotsky Sobrinho (FMSS) and took on three lines of action: editorial, advertising and institutional. This campaign also sets education as the main focus of Grupo RBS’ social investment, hereby reinforcing the company's historic compromise towards sustained development within the communities in which it makes itself present.

Grupo RBS’ educational campaign will take on a new phase in 2013.  Education-related subjects will continue to be featured as a main editorial concern within RBS’ media outlets while new institutional actions shall promote even more community-based mobilization and engagement towards the cause throughout the year.

Segments

Television
 RBS TV
 TVCOM (Florianópolis only)
 OCTO OC

Radio
 Farroupilha AM+FM
 Rural AM
 CBN 1340, Porto Alegre
 Rede Gaúcha Sat
 Itapema FM
 Rede Atlântida
 CBN Diário, Florianópolis

Live rádios

Rio Grande do Sul
 Farroupilha AM on frequency 680 kHz AM
 92 FM  on frequency 92.1 MHz FM
 CBN Porto Alegre AM, Porto Alegre on frequency 1.340 kHz AM
 Rádio Gaúcha Porto Alegre, on frequency 600 kHz FM and on frequency 93,7 MHz FM; Santa Maria, on frequency 105,7 MHz FM; Caxias do Sul, on frequency 102,7 MHz FM
 Rádio 102.3 FM Porto Alegre, on frequency 102,3 MHz FM
 Rede Atlântida

Rio Grande do Sul
 Atlântida Caxias do Sul - 105,7 MHz[21]
 Atlântida Passo Fundo - 97,1 MHz[22]
 Atlântida Pelotas - 95,3 MHz[23]
 Atlântida Porto Alegre - 94,3 MHz[24]
 Atlântida Rio Grande - 102,1 MHz[25]
 Atlântida Santa Cruz - 93,3 MHz[26]
 Atlântida Santa Maria - 94,3 MHz[27]
 Atlântida Tramandaí - 104,7 MHz[28]

Santa Catarina
 Atlântida Blumenau - 102,7 MHz[29]
 Atlântida Joinville - 104,3 MHz[30]
 Atlântida Chapecó - 99,3 MHz[31]
 Atlântida Criciúma - 97,3 MHz[32]
 Atlântida Florianópolis - 100,9 MHz[33]
 CBN Diário Florianópolis on frequency 740 kHz AM[34]

Newspapers
 Zero Hora
 Diário Gaúcho
 Pioneiro
 Diário de Santa Maria
 Diário Catarinense
 Jornal de Santa Catarina
 Hora de Santa Catarina
 A Notícia
 O Sol Diário; a supplement for the group's Santa Catarina newspapers inserted in the editions destined for the Itajaí micro-region and displaying regional news articles.

Internet
 clicRBS
 hagah
 Predicta
 ObaOba 
 Pense Imóveis
 Pense Carros
 Pense Empregos
 Guia Da Semana
 Grupo .Mobi
 Wine Vinhos
 Lets
 Vitrinepix
 Hi-Mídia

Logistics
 Vialog

Other ventures
 Book publisher: RBS Publicações
 Record company: Orbeat Music
 Trust: Fundação Maurício Sirotsky Sobrinho

See also
 List of newspapers in Brazil

References

External links
  Official Site

 
Companies based in Rio Grande do Sul
Newspaper companies of Brazil
Mass media companies of Brazil
Mass media in Porto Alegre
Mass media companies established in 1957
1957 establishments in Brazil